Johnny Douglas Ekström (born 5 March 1965) is a Swedish former professional footballer who played as a forward and a winger. He played professionally in Italy, Germany, France, and Spain but is best remembered for his time in Sweden with IFK Göteborg with which he was the 1986 Allsvenskan top scorer and won three Swedish Championships. A full international between 1986 and 1995, he won 47 caps for the Sweden national team and represented his country at the 1990 FIFA World Cup and UEFA Euro 1992.

Club career

IFK Göteborg 
A product of the IFK Göteborg youth academy, Ekström was promoted to the first team in 1983 before making his Allsvenskan debut during the 1984 season. He quickly earned the nicknames "Kallebäcks-Expressen" (the express train from Kallebäck) and "Johnny Bråttom" (Johnny-in-a-hurry) due to his speed on the football pitch. His most successful season with Göteborg came in 1986, when he was the 1986 Allsvenskan top scorer and helped the club reach the semi-finals of the 1985–86 European Cup before being eliminated by FC Barcelona. He also played in the first half of the 1986–87 UEFA Cup which IFK Göteborg ended up winning after Ekström's departure.

Empoli 
Ekström was the most expensive Swedish transfer of all time when he signed for Empoli during the 1986–87 Serie A season. At Empoli, he became a popular and respected player and acquired the nickname 'Il Ciclone' (the cyclone) due to the exceptional speed he displayed when charging ahead with the ball in his possession, which was his most notable quality.

Bayern Munich 
In 1988 Ekström signed for the German Bundesliga club FC Bayern Munich, and helped them win the 1988–89 Bundesliga title and reach the semi-finals of the 1988–89 UEFA Cup before being eliminated by Napoli.

Cannes 
He signed with AS Cannes in Ligue 1 in 1989 and played alongside a young Zinedine Zidane before leaving the club in 1991.

Return to IFK Göteborg 
Ekström returned to Swedish football and IFK Göteborg in 1991, winning the 1991 and 1993 Swedish Championships, as well as the 1991 Svenska Cupen. He also played in the 1992–93 UEFA Champions League where Göteborg finished joint-third behind Marseille and A.C. Milan.

Reggiana 
Ekström returned to Serie A and Italian football in 1993, signing for Reggiana. Ekström played in 9 Serie A games for Reggiana during the 1993–94 Serie A season before spending the rest of the season on loan in Spain.

Loan to Real Betis 
Ekström spent the spring of 1994 with Real Betis on loan from Reggiana, becoming the second Swedish player to represent the Seville-based club after Torbjörn Jonsson. He played in seven Segunda División games during the 1993–94 season and scored two goals.

Dynamo Dresden 
During the summer of 1994, Ekström returned to German football and the Bundesliga after signing a two-year-contract with Dynamo Dresden. He ended up playing one season for the club, scoring seven goals in 30 Bundesliga games.

Eintracht Frankfurt 
Ekström signed for Eintracht Frankfurt in 1995, and scored two goals in 16 games as the club was relegated to 2. Bundesliga in 1996. He stayed with the club in 2. Bundesliga, but could not help the team win promotion back to the top flight of German football.

Second return to IFK Göteborg and retirement 
He returned to IFK Göteborg a second time in 1997, and spent the 1997 and 1998 Allsvenskan seasons with the club before retiring from professional football in late 1998. In total, Ekström appeared in more than 200 games for IFK Göteborg during his three stints with the club.

International career

Youth 
Ekström played 12 games for the Sweden U21 team and was a part of the Sweden U21 squad that reached the quarterfinals of the 1986 UEFA European Under-21 Championship before being eliminated by Italy.

Senior 
Ekström made his full international debut in a friendly game against Greece on 1 May 1986, playing for 71 minutes alongside Dan Corneliusson at forward before being replaced by Lasse Larsson in a 0–0 draw. He scored his first international goal in a 3–1 friendly win against Finland on 6 August 1986.

UEFA Euro 1988 qualifying 
Ekström made his competitive international debut for Sweden on 24 September 1986 in a UEFA Euro 1988 qualifying game against Switzerland, which Sweden won 2–0 after two goals by Ekström. He went on to score another four goals in the same qualifying campaign, making him the joint-third best goalscorer in the UEFA Euro 1988 qualifiers at six goals together with Alessandra Altobelli but behind John Bosman and Nico Claesen. Despite Ekström's goals, Sweden did not manage to qualify for Euro 1988.

1990 FIFA World Cup 
Ekström scored two goals during the 1990 FIFA World Cup qualifying campaign to help Sweden qualify for its first World Cup since 1978. While at the 1990 World Cup, he appeared in the second group stage game against Scotland, replacing Stefan Pettersson in the 63rd minute in a 1–2 loss. He started in the third group stage game against Costa Rica, scoring the first goal in a third consecutive 1–2 loss which had Sweden eliminated from the tournament.

UEFA Euro 1992 
Ekström was a part of the Sweden squad at UEFA Euro 1992 on home soil in Sweden and appeared as a substitute in all four games as Sweden reached the semi-finals of the tournament before being eliminated by Germany.

Later years and retirement 
Ekström played in four 1994 FIFA World Cup qualifying games before announcing his retirement from international football in October 1993. He made a brief comeback on 8 March 1995 in a friendly 3–3 draw with Cyprus in which Ekström scored one of the goals. He won a total of 47 caps for the Sweden national team, scoring 13 goals.

Career statistics

International 

Scores and results list Sweden's goal tally first, score column indicates score after each Ekström goal.

Honours 
IFK Göteborg
 Allsvenskan: 1984, 1991, 1993
 Svenska Cupen: 1991
 UEFA cup: 1986–87

Bayern München
 Bundesliga: 1988–89

Individual
 Allsvenskan top scorer: 1986
Stor Grabb: 1988

References

External links
 
 

1965 births
Living people
Swedish footballers
Association football midfielders
Association football forwards
Sweden international footballers
Sweden under-21 international footballers
IFK Göteborg players
UEFA Cup winning players
FC Bayern Munich footballers
AS Cannes players
Ligue 1 players
Dynamo Dresden players
Eintracht Frankfurt players
Empoli F.C. players
A.C. Reggiana 1919 players
Serie A players
Real Betis players
Segunda División players
Bundesliga players
2. Bundesliga players
Allsvenskan players
1990 FIFA World Cup players
UEFA Euro 1992 players
Swedish expatriate footballers
Swedish expatriate sportspeople in Germany
Expatriate footballers in Germany
Swedish expatriate sportspeople in Italy
Expatriate footballers in Italy
Swedish expatriate sportspeople in France
Expatriate footballers in France
Swedish expatriate sportspeople in Spain
Expatriate footballers in Spain